Leicester's Corn Exchange stands in the City centre of Leicester, England. The exchange is sited at the centre of the Market Place and is a Grade II* listed building. The exchange currently operates as a Lloyds No. 1 bar.

There have been buildings on the site since the 16th century. The present building was built in the 1850s by William Flint as a market place. In 1856 an upper floor and external stone staircase were added by F.W. Ordish to house the Corn Exchange.

A corn exchange was a building where farmers and merchants traded cereal grains, common up until the 19th century in towns and cities of Great Britain and Ireland. For the history of corn exchanges, see Commodity market and Commodities exchange.

References

History of Leicester
Buildings and structures in Leicester
Pubs in Leicestershire
Grade II* listed buildings in Leicestershire